Metropolis Coffee Company is a coffee roasting company, wholesaler and retailer with locations at 1039 W. Granville Avenue and 3057 N. Rockwell Avenue in Chicago, Illinois.  The company supplies coffee to hundreds of cafes and restaurants throughout the US, Canada, and Korea. In 2005, they were named by Newcity as the best place in Chicago to buy coffee beans and noted for their donation of $2 to Oxfam for Tsunami for each pound of beans purchased. Metropolis is also a back-to-back winner of the Good Food Awards, and winner of Roast Magazine's Roaster of the Year - A national roasting competition.

Metropolis was founded by father and son Jeff and Tony Dreyfuss, both of whom travel overseas to purchase their beans from places including Peru and the Indonesian island of Sumatra.

References

Restaurants established in 2003
Coffeehouses and cafés in the United States
Food and drink companies based in Chicago